Jewel Evelyn Coburn ( Blanch; born 4 March 1958) is an Australian music publisher, singer and former actress.

Biography 
Jewel Coburn was born as Jewel Evelyn Blanch on 4 March 1958 in Glen Innes, New South Wales, to Berice Ida ( Collins) and Arthur Ernest Blanch. Both parents were established country music performers. The family were living on a farm, "Harmony Hill",  from Brisbane. Blanch appeared on Brisbane's Coca-Cola TV Show, singing and playing a ukulele, aged 3. She recorded a novelty song "I Wanna Stay on Jumbo" in 1962 at the age of four, which was issued in March 1963. During her childhood, Blanch and her parents toured as the Blanch Family or the Blanches.

She appeared on television programs in Australia and the United States, The Linkletter Show, The Barry Crocker Show and Junior Bandstand. At the age of 8, Blanch had a recording contract with EMI Records for four songs on its imprint, HMV. The family embarked on a fifteen-month tour of the United States from December 1963, during which time Blanch attended a Beverly Hills Unified School District. They returned to Australia in 1965, but relocated to the US in 1968 where Blanch was signed to Capitol Records and worked with Al De Lory.

During the 1970s, Blanch became better known for her acting, working on American television programs, The Mod Squad, Bonanza, Lassie, Night Gallery, Owen Marshall, Counselor at Law and Jigsaw John. For secondary education she attended University High School, West Los Angeles and then Hollywood Professional School. The actress appeared in the films, Baffled! (1973), The Morning After (1974), and Against a Crooked Sky (1975). Blanch received critical praise for playing a visually impaired girl on the ABC Afterschool Special, Blind Sunday in 1976. She had a guest role as Abbie Singleton for six episodes of Australian soap The Young Doctors in 1977.

Blanch's singing career developed in the late 1970s and she was recognised as an emerging talent by publications such as Record World and Cashbox. She won Billboard's Country Music Award for Number One New Female Singles Artist in 1979.

Blanch's handprints were imprinted into the new Australian Country Music Hands of Fame monument in Tamworth, New South Wales in recognition of the success she had already achieved during her career.

Blanch went on to have further success as a country music performer, winning three Golden Guitars at the Country Music Awards of Australia. In 1982, she was awarded Golden Guitars for Female Vocalist of the Year and for Album of the Year, for "The Lady and the Cowboy" which she had recorded with her father.  The following year, Blanch was again awarded the Golden Guitar for Female Vocalist of the Year.

Upon marrying Barry Coburn in 1982, she returned to the United States in 1984 where the couple opened a music publishing company called Ten Ten Music Group. In 2012, Coburn co-founded the Eleven Eleven Music Group with Jason Morris. Coburn sold her share of the Ten Ten Music Group in 2014.

References

External links

Billboard Chart History: Jewel Blanch

1958 births
Living people
20th-century Australian women singers